Jakuševec is a neighborhood in the Novi Zagreb – istok city district of Zagreb, the capital of Croatia. Located on Sajmišna Road east of Sarajevska Road and Utrine, Travno and Dugave apartment block complexes, the neighborhood is mostly uninhabited, with an area of 455.21 ha and a total population of around 2,000. It is the site of the city's largest landfill, the city's biggest used car market (referred to as "Hrelić" which is actually a separate settlement further south) and the Zlatni Konj art gallery.
The first records of inhabitants in Jakuševec area date back to 1334 as "Parochia Sancti Marci Ev. in campo", which is the name recorded up to 1501. At that time, the parish' name is changed to "Parocha Sancti Marci Ev. in spinis". However, during the leadership of pastor Josip Vitković, the parish is renamed in 1871 to "Parish of Jakuševec".
Jakuševec remained a standalone village until 1991 when it was integrated along with several adjacent villages into the City of Zagreb.

References 

Neighbourhoods of Zagreb